Nikhat Zareen (born 14 June 1996) is an Indian boxer. She won gold medal at the 2011 AIBA Women's Youth & Junior World Boxing Championships held in Antalya. Zareen won gold medal at the 2022 IBA Women's World Boxing Championships, and became the fifth Indian woman to win a gold medal at the IBA World Boxing Championships. Zareen works as general banking officer at Bank of India since June 2021. She won gold medal at the Birmingham 2022 Commonwealth Games.

Personal life
Nikhat Zareen was born on 14 June 1996 to Mohammad Jameel Ahmed and Parveen Sultana in Nizamabad city of Andhra Pradesh (now Telangana). She completed her primary education from the Nirmala Hrudaya Girls High School in Nizamabad. She is pursuing a degree in Bachelor of Arts (B.A.) at AV College in Hyderabad, Telangana.

Zareen has been appointed as the staff officer in the Bank of India, zonal office at AC Guards, Hyderabad.

Career 
Zareen was introduced to boxing by her father, Mohammad Jameel Ahmed, and she trained under him for a year. Nikhat was inducted into the Sports Authority of India in Vishakhapatnam to train under Dronacharya awardee, IV Rao in 2009. A year later, she was being declared as the 'golden best boxer' at the Erode Nationals in 2010.

2011 Women's Junior and Youth World Boxing Championships 
Won gold medal in flyweight division held at the AIBA Women's Junior and Youth World Boxing Championship in Turkey. Zareen was up against Turkish boxer Ulku Demir and after three rounds won the bout 27:16.

2014 Youth World Boxing Championships 
She won a silver medal in the Youth World Boxing Championship held in Bulgaria in 2014.

2014 Nations Cup International Boxing Tournament 
She won a gold medal at the third Nations Cup International Boxing Tournament held in Novi Sad, Serbia on 12 January 2014. Zareen defeated Paltceva Ekaterina of Russia in the 51 kg weight category.

2015 16th Senior Woman National Boxing Championship 
She won a gold medal at 16th Senior Woman National Boxing Championship at Assam,

2019 Thailand Open International Boxing Tournament 
She won a silver medal at Thailand Open International Boxing Tournament held in Bangkok.

2019 Strandja Memorial Boxing Tournament  
She won a gold medal at Strandja Memorial Boxing Tournament held in Sofia, Bulgaria.

2022 Strandja Memorial Boxing Tournament  
Zareen defeated Ukraine's Tetiana Kob, a three-time European Championships medallist 4-1 to clinch a gold medal at the 73rd Strandja Memorial Boxing Tournament in Sofia, Bulgaria. The women's team was led by coach Bhaskar Bhatt. She also beat Tokyo Olympics silver medallist Buse Naz Çakıroğlu in the semi-finals.

2022 IBA Women's World Boxing Championships 
On 19 May 2022, Zareen won the gold medal in the 52 kg category at the Women's World Championship defeating Thailand's Jitpong Jutamas in the fly-weight final in Istanbul, Turkey. Zareen became the fifth Indian women's boxer to win a gold medal at the World Championships, joining Mary Kom, Laishram Sarita Devi, Jenny R. L., and Lekha K. C. She was only the second Indian boxer to win a World Championships Gold Medal abroad (outside India) after M.C. Mary Kom, who did it four times out of her six Gold Medals.

2022 Commonwealth Games 
Zareen won the third gold medal for India in the Commonwealth Games 2022 in Birmingham after defeating Carly McNaul of Northern Ireland by 5-0 on 7 August 2022 in the 48–50 kg category (light flyweight category).

Achievements

Brand endorsements
In 2018, Zareen signed a brand endorsement deal with Adidas. Zareen is supported by the Welspun group and is included in the Target Olympic Podium Scheme of
Sports Authority of India.

Awards 
 Nikhat was appointed the official ambassador of her home town Nizamabad, Telangana.
 'Best Boxer' in the All India Inter-University Boxing Championship, Jalandhar, Punjab - February 2015
 JFW award for Excellence in Sports 2019.
  Arjuna Award 2022

References

External links
Indian Boxing Federation Boxer Details Nikhat Zareen
 

Living people
1996 births
People from Nizamabad, Telangana
Boxers from Telangana
Indian women boxers
Flyweight boxers
AIBA Women's World Boxing Championships medalists
Boxers at the 2022 Commonwealth Games
Telugu people
Commonwealth Games gold medallists for India
Commonwealth Games medallists in boxing
21st-century Indian women
Recipients of the Arjuna Award
Medallists at the 2022 Commonwealth Games